Trebež is a suburban settlement of Belgrade, the capital of Serbia. It is located in the municipality of Barajevo. According to the 2002 census, the village has a population of 8,325 people.

References

Suburbs of Belgrade
Barajevo